Romance in Rhythm is a 1934 British mystery film directed by Lawrence Huntington and starring Phyllis Clare and David Hutcheson, David Burns. It was made at Cricklewood Studios. The screenplay concerns a songwriter who is accused of murdering a nightclub manager.

Cast
 Phyllis Clare as Ruth Lee  
 David Hutcheson as Bob Mervyn  
 David Burns as Mollari 
 Queenie Leonard as Skye Gunderson 
 Paul Tillett
 Geoffrey Goodheart 
 Philip Strange 
 Julian Vedey  
 Carroll Gibbons as himself with his Savoy Orpheans

References

Bibliography
Chibnall, Steve. Quota Quickies: The Birth of the British 'B' Film. British Film Institute, 2007.
Low, Rachael. Filmmaking in 1930s Britain. George Allen & Unwin, 1985.
Wood, Linda. British Films, 1927–1939. British Film Institute, 1986.

External links

1934 films
British mystery films
British black-and-white films
1934 mystery films
Films directed by Lawrence Huntington
Films shot at Cricklewood Studios
1930s English-language films
1930s British films